The 2012 AdvoCare V100 Independence Bowl was a post-season American college football bowl game held on December 28, 2012, at Independence Stadium in Shreveport, Louisiana, in the United States. The 37th edition of the Independence Bowl began at 1:00 p.m. CST and aired on ESPN. The game's title sponsor was AdvoCare, an American dietary supplement company.

The game featured the Ohio Bobcats from the Mid-American Conference against the Louisiana–Monroe Warhawks from the Sun Belt Conference and was the final game of the 2012 NCAA Division I FBS football season for both teams.  Both the Bobcats and the Warhawks accepted their invitation after finishing at 8–4 during the regular season. This was both teams' first appearance in the Independence Bowl.

Teams
Under normal circumstances, the Independence Bowl would feature the seventh bowl-eligible team from the Atlantic Coast Conference against the tenth bowl-eligible team from the Southeastern Conference.  However, both conferences are one school shy of having enough bowl-eligible teams to qualify (the ACC has six and the SEC has nine).

On Friday, November 30, Louisiana Tech was invited to play in the Independence Bowl but asked for more time as they were in negotiations with the Liberty Bowl and Heart of Dallas Bowl. Louisiana Tech athletic director Bruce Van De Velde and WAC commissioner Jeff Hurd both claimed that on Saturday, December 1, the Liberty Bowl executive director Steve Ehrhart guaranteed the Bulldogs a bowl invite. After the Independence Bowl's deadline for Louisiana Tech to accept their invitation passed, the Independence Bowl selected the MAC's Ohio (8-4) instead. On Sunday, December 2, the Liberty Bowl extended their remaining bid to Iowa State (6-6) instead of Louisiana Tech (9-3). The Bulldogs did not end up playing in any bowl game despite boasting the nation's top scoring offense.

This was the first meeting between these two teams.

Ohio

Despite a promising 7–0 start to the season (including a #23 ranking as well as defeating Penn State), the Bobcats would decline during their last five games, posting a mere 1–4 record during that timespan, dropping their conference record to 4-4, only good for third place in the MAC East Division.  When Louisiana Tech declined their invitation, the Bobcats accepted theirs.

Louisiana–Monroe

In their first winning season since joining Division I FBS (then Division I-A) in 1994 (when they were the Northeast Louisiana Indians), the Warhawks finished in a tie for second place in the Sun Belt, amassing a 6–2 conference and 8–4 overall record.  After the season, the Warhawks accepted an invitation to the 2012 Independence Bowl.

This was the first bowl game in school history for the Warhawks, being one of two teams making their bowl debut this season (along with fellow Sun Belt member the Western Kentucky Hilltoppers).

Game summary

Scoring summary

Statistics

Starting lineups
Source:

References

Independence Bowl
Independence Bowl
Louisiana–Monroe Warhawks football bowl games
Ohio Bobcats football bowl games
Independence Bowl
December 2012 sports events in the United States